The 2014 Omloop Het Nieuwsblad – Women's race took place on 1 March 2014. It was the 9th women's edition of the Omloop Het Nieuwsblad. This year's Omloop started and ended  in Ghent, Belgium and spanned  in the province of East Flanders.

The race was won by Dutch rider Amy Pieters with Emma Johansson and Lizzie Armitstead second and third respectively.

Results

References

Omloop Het Nieuwsblad – Women's race
Omloop Het Nieuwsblad
Omloop Het Nieuwsblad